The Gothenburg Book Fair (also known as Göteborg Book Fair, Bok & Bibliotek, Bok- och biblioteksmässan or Bokmässan) is an annual event held in Gothenburg, Sweden, since 1985.

Overview
It started primarily as a trade fair (for librarians and teachers), but is now the largest literary festival in Scandinavia and the second largest book fair in Europe after the Frankfurt Book Fair. The book fair usually takes place in the last week of September each year. It has around 100,000 visitors and 900 exhibitors annually.

References

External links

 

Recurring events established in 1985
Book fairs in Sweden
Festivals in Sweden
Culture in Gothenburg
1985 establishments in Sweden
Events in Gothenburg